Sinoadina is a genus of flowering plants belonging to the family Rubiaceae.

Its native range is Indo-China to Temperate Eastern Asia.

Species
Species:
 Sinoadina racemosa (Siebold & Zucc.) Ridsdale

References

Rubiaceae
Rubiaceae genera